The 1823 Massachusetts gubernatorial election was held on April 7.

Federalist Governor John Brooks did not run for a seventh term in office. William Eustis, a Republican, was elected to succeed him over U.S. Senator Harrison Gray Otis. Eustis was the first Republican elected Governor since Elbridge Gerry in 1811; no Federalist would ever win a gubernatorial election again, and the state party rapidly collapsed.

General election

Candidates
Harrison Gray Otis, former U.S. Senator (Federalist)
William Eustis, U.S. Representative and former U.S. Secretary of War (Republican)

Results

References

Governor
1823
Massachusetts
November 1823 events